The Yamaha YZ125 is a motocross racing motorcycle with a two-stroke  displacement single-cylinder engine made by Yamaha since 1974. It is available to the public. For the first two years it was made with dual rear shocks, then changing to a monoshock. The YZ125 has been ridden to five AMA National Motocross Championships, and multiple AMA Regional Supercross Championships.

In 2001, Yamaha released a bike designed to complement the YZ125, the four-stroke YZ250F. The two bikes shared a rolling chassis and are eligible to compete in the same racing class. The YZ250F has a slight horsepower advantage.

The YZ125 has a  reed valve-inducted two-stroke engine. It was air cooled from 1974 to 1980, and liquid cooled since 1981. It has a Mikuni 38 mm TMX series carburetor. The engine produces .

The YZ125 has been built with five- or six-speed manual sequential gearbox depending on model year. The 2005 model has a constant-mesh, wet, multiple-disc coil-spring clutch.

From 1973 through 2004, the YZ125 had a single backbone frame made from steel. For the 2005 year, Yamaha switched to a single backbone frame constructed from an aluminum alloy. For 2008 models, the wheel assemblies and front fork suspension were redesigned, yielding additional weight savings, making wet weight, no gas sub-200 lb. Aluminum-framed YZ125s are notably "flickable" and sometimes this trait is seen as a drawback since they tend to become more difficult to control on rough surfaces. The YZ125 used a conventional telescopic fork tube through 1988, then in 1989, added the first upside-down fork. A very well knows the amount of riders have chosen this as their go-to bike, such as AMA Champ Dom Barbuto and his brother Nick Barbuto, and X-Games medalist Kyle Ford. Also, 11-time Nationals winner and rival of Eli Tomac, Richard Rich

References

External links
 

YZ125
Off-road motorcycles
Motorcycles introduced in 1974
Two-stroke motorcycles